The Alamosa Solar Generating Plant is a 35.3 MWp (30.0 MWAC) concentrator photovoltaics (CPV) power station, the largest in the world when it was completed, in May 2012.
 
   It is currently the world's third largest operating CPV facility. The output is being sold to Public Service of Colorado, a subsidiary of Xcel Energy, under a long term Power Purchase Agreement.

Facility construction details 

The facility consists of 504 dual-axis Amonix 7700 solar tracking systems and Solectria grid-connected 70 kW inverters.  Each system supports seven CPV "MegaModules" which are each rated to produce about 10 kWp. Each module contains 1,080 fresnel lenses to concentrate sunlight 500 times onto multi-junction solar cells, allowing a greater efficiency than conventional photovoltaic power plants.

The facility is sited on 225 acres at an elevation of 7,500 feet in the sunny and cool San Luis Valley, along with several other solar farms.  It was built by Mortenson construction and is the world's largest assembly of Amonix CPV technology.

Ownership, funding, and operations 

Construction was financed in September 2011 by a special purpose subsidiary of the Goldman Sachs Group's Cogentrix Energy Power Management with a US$90.6 million loan that is guaranteed by the U.S. Department of Energy.  The facility became operational less than 9 months later in April 2012. In August 2016, Cogentrix sold the project for US$35 million to Korea Electric Power Corporation and its COPA pension fund, both of which are majority held by the South Korean government. 
   Cogentrix Services continues to operate and maintain the facility.

Electricity production

Comparison to flat-panel photovoltaic plants 

Findings of a 2013 NREL land use report showed CPV as having the highest land-energy-density potential of any photovoltaic technology surveyed in the United States, requiring an average 2.8 acres/GW·h/yr for power plants larger than 20 MW.   Flat-panel fixed and single-axis tracking plants of similar capacity typically used 3.7 and 3.3 acres/GW·h/yr, respectively.  Based on current energy production statistics, land use for the 225 acre Alamosa CPV project averages 3.7 acres/GW·h/yr (= 270 MW·h/acre annual production).

See also

 Hatch Solar Energy Center
 Touwsrivier CPV Solar Project
 Hooper Solar PV Power Plant
 San Luis Valley Solar Ranch
 Solar power in Colorado
 Solar power in the United States

External links
  VIDEO: Amonix CPV Solar Installation Timelapse
  VIDEO: Amonix 7700 System Description
 Performance analysis and modeling of the world's largest CPV power plant
 Field performance analysis of different Fresnel lenses in Amonix CPV systems
 Amonix - Concentrated Photovoltaic (CPV) Solar Power Solutions in the Southwest
 Arzon Solar website

References

Energy infrastructure completed in 2012
Buildings and structures in Alamosa County, Colorado
Photovoltaic power stations in Colorado
Photovoltaic power stations in the United States